The 2019 NCAA Division I Baseball season, play of college baseball in the United States organized by the National Collegiate Athletic Association (NCAA) at the Division I level, began February 15, 2019. The season  progressed through the regular season, many conference tournaments and championship series, and concluded with the 2019 NCAA Division I baseball tournament and 2019 College World Series. The College World Series, consisting of the eight remaining teams in the NCAA tournament and held annually in Omaha, Nebraska, at TD Ameritrade Park Omaha, ended on June 26, 2019. The Vanderbilt Commodores won the tournament, and were consequently named national champions.

Realignment and format changes
 Liberty, after 27 seasons in the Big South Conference, joined the Atlantic Sun Conference (ASUN) on July 1, 2018.
 USC Upstate, after 11 years in the ASUN, moved to the Big South.
 North Alabama upgraded its program from NCAA Division II, joining the Atlantic Sun Conference.

Finally, one other Division I team changed its institutional and athletic identities immediately after the 2017–18 season. Indiana University and Purdue University dissolved Indiana University – Purdue University Fort Wayne (IPFW) on July 1, 2018. IPFW's academic programs in health sciences transferred to the IU system as Indiana University Fort Wayne; all remaining academic programs were transferred to the Purdue system as Purdue University Fort Wayne (PFW). From 2018–19, the former IPFW athletic program represents only PFW, and its Summit League membership was assumed by PFW. Shortly before the dissolution took effect, but after the school's baseball season had finished, the athletic program announced that it would henceforth be known as the Purdue Fort Wayne Mastodons.

On October 3, 2018, Long Island University announced that it would merge its two current athletic programs—the LIU Brooklyn Blackbirds, members of the Northeast Conference (NEC), and LIU Post Pioneers, a Division II program in the East Coast Conference—into a single Division I program effective with the 2019–20 school year. The new program will compete under the LIU name with a new nickname. With both campuses sponsoring baseball, the unified LIU team will maintain LIU Brooklyn's NEC membership, but will be based on the Post campus in Brookville, New York.

Ballpark changes
 The 2019 season was the first for Kentucky at their new ballpark Kentucky Proud Park, replacing Cliff Hagan Stadium.
 The 2019 season was the last for UConn at J.O. Christian Field before construction of a new stadium, to be known as Elliot Ballpark, that will open for the 2020 season.
 The 2019 season was the last for the Oklahoma State team at Allie P. Reynolds Stadium. The team will move to a new ballpark in 2020.

Season outlook

Conference standings

Conference winners and tournaments
Of the 31 Division I athletic conferences that sponsor baseball, 29 ended their regular seasons with a single-elimination tournament or a double elimination tournament. The teams in each conference that won their regular season title are given the number one seed in each tournament. Two conferences, the Big West and Pac-12, did not hold a conference tournament. The winners of those tournaments, plus the Big West and Pac-12 regular-season champions, received automatic invitations to the 2019 NCAA Division I baseball tournament.

Final rankings

Coaching changes
This table lists programs that changed head coaches at any point from the first day of the 2019 season until the day before the first day of the 2020 season.

See also
2019 NCAA Division I softball season

References